Halemweg is a station on the Berlin U-Bahn line U7, located in the Charlottenburg-Nord district. It was opened on 1 October 1980 (architect R.G.Rümmler) with the line's extension from Richard-Wagner-Platz to Rohrdamm. The eponymous neighborhood street is named after Resistance fighter Nikolaus von Halem, who was executed in Brandenburg-Görden Prison on 9 October 1944. The next station is Jakob-Kaiser-Platz.

Notes 

U7 (Berlin U-Bahn) stations
Buildings and structures in Charlottenburg-Wilmersdorf
Railway stations in Germany opened in 1980